Sacred Heart of Jesus Parish was a parish of the Roman Catholic Church designated for Polish immigrants in Greenfield, Massachusetts. Founded 1914, it was one of the Polish-American Roman Catholic parishes in New England in the Diocese of Springfield in Massachusetts. The diocese closed the parish in 2009.

History 
The Greenfield Polish community had become well established by 1910, the church beginning to offer mass in the Polish language. The parish grew large enough by 1920 to support and establish their own church facility. A survey of Polish parishes taken during World War II showed 944 members of the community, with 153 members serving in the military and four having died during military service.

Though the parish closed in 2009, the community still honored the church with several celebrations in 2011. After closing, the parish was joined with the "Our Lady of Peace" parish community.

Notes

Sources 

 
 
 The Official Catholic Directory in USA

External links 
 Sacred Heart - TheCatholicDirectory.com
 Diocese of Springfield in Massachusetts
 Pastoral planning in Diocese of Springfield in Massachusetts

Roman Catholic parishes of Diocese of Springfield in Massachusetts
Polish-American Roman Catholic parishes in Massachusetts
Greenfield, Massachusetts